The Stupids is a 1996 adventure comedy film starring Tom Arnold and directed by John Landis. It is based on The Stupids, characters from a series of books written by Harry Allard and illustrated by James Marshall.

The film follows the fictional family, the Stupids, with a last name synonymous with their behavior. The story begins with patriarch Stanley Stupid believing "sender" from letters marked "return to sender" is a wicked man planning a conspiracy. Adding several misunderstandings, they unwittingly save the world from military chaos, while believing a fake story about a fictional man named Sender and his plot to confiscate everyone's mail and garbage.

Plot
Stanley and Joan Stupid are convinced they are victims of a conspiracy that steals their garbage every week. In an attempt to uncover this, Stanley follows the garbage truck to the city dump, where he stumbles across Colonel Neidermeyer, who is selling contraband weaponry to a group of terrorists. He believes Stanley to be a secret agent who has uncovered their operation and orders him assassinated, and after several attempts on his life result in him unintentionally killing his would-be assassins, he narrowly escapes a car bomb and is presumed dead by Neidermeyer.

Meanwhile, Stanley and Joan's children, Petunia and Buster, believe they have been kidnapped by a Chinese restaurant and go in search of them. They reunite with Joan, who explains her theory that the police have turned against them and are responsible for Stanley being missing.

Once the Stupids are reunited at home, Joan tells Petunia and Buster about Stanley's last job for the postal service where he discovered all the letters being marked "return to sender", but was fired before he could find out who "Mr. Sender" was. He tells his family about the conspiracy theory he has invented that combines all the ideas their overactive imaginations have created, including the "Evil Mr. Sender" plotting to steal all the mail and garbage from America and employing the police to kidnap anybody who discovers his scheme.  When they find local museum curator Charles Sender in the phone book they set off in pursuit, ultimately tracking him to a television studio where Stanley appears on a talk show and is spotted by Niedermeyer who has him kidnapped and brought to the army base.

While being held hostage at the army base, Stanley overhears the address of the warehouse being used for the illegal arms deals. Following an escape, the Stupids go to the warehouse, where they expect to find Sender and the stolen mail. They confront Neidermeyer and his terrorist associates in a battle, resulting in some explosions that cause the police to investigate the warehouse. The associates are arrested but Neidermeyer escapes. Stanley offers what he perceives to be heroic advice about how Sender can repent his evil ways, but he takes them as road directions. The Stupids return home, only to find a vengeful Neidermeyer waiting for them, armed with a handgun. Luckily, just as he is about to kill them, Neidermeyer is knocked out from behind the front door by a deli deliveryman that Joan had called round earlier. In the end, the Stupids celebrate their success with an outdoor barbeque. The aliens show up and attempt to do away with Stanley, but their plan is thwarted.

Cast
 Tom Arnold as Stanley Stupid
 Jessica Lundy as Joan Stupid
 Alex McKenna as Petunia Stupid
 Bug Hall as Buster Stupid
 Mark Metcalf as Colonel Neidermeyer
 Bob Keeshan as Charles Sender
 Christopher Lee as Evil Mr. Sender
 Matt Keeslar as Lieutenant Neal
 Frankie Faison as Lloyd
 David Ferry as Late night show host
 Max Landis as Graffiti artist
 George Chiang as Chinese Waiter #1

Celebrity cameos
 Rolonda Watts as Talk show hostess
 Jenny McCarthy as Glamorous actress
 Atom Egoyan as TV studio guard
 Norman Jewison as TV director
 Robert Wise as Stanley's neighbor
 David Cronenberg as Postal supervisor
 Gillo Pontecorvo as Talk show guest
 Costa-Gavras as Gas station attendant
 Gurinder Chadha as Reporter #1
 Mick Garris as Reporter #2
 Harvey Atkin as Deli Guy
 Anthony J. Mifsud as Explosive Guy

Production
The film was shot in Toronto, Ontario (downtown shots) and Uxbridge, Ontario (Home located at 55 Quaker Village Drive, Uxbridge, Ontario).

Reception
The film grossed $2,491,989 in North America from an estimated $25 million budget, and became Landis' weakest performing film.

The film opened to negative reviews. Review aggregation website Rotten Tomatoes gave it a score of 20% based on 15 reviews, as of November 2017. Audiences surveyed by CinemaScore gave it a grade of "C+" on a scale of A+ to F.

Bruce Fretts of Entertainment Weekly gave it a grade F, calling it "Guaranteed 100 percent laugh-free." Derek Elley of Variety wrote: "The problem with "The Stupids" is that it isn't stupid enough by half. Lacking both the sheer gross-out humor of "Dumb and Dumber" and the carefully thought-through tone of the Brady pics".

John Landis said that he was proud of the film: "I'm happy to say it's very successful on television, and extremely successful on video because people buy it for their kids. It's meant for ten-year-olds. That really went under the radar. But I really like that picture. And that one had a great score by Christopher Stone."

Accolades
At the 1996 Golden Raspberry Awards and 1996 Stinkers Bad Movie Awards, Arnold won Worst Actor for his performances in Big Bully, Carpool, and this film. For the Razzies, it was also nominated for the awards for Worst Picture, Worst Director (John Landis), and Worst Screenplay (Brent Forrester). For the Stinkers, it was also nominated for Worst Picture and Most Painfully Unfunny Comedy; it was also handpicked for the Founders Award - What Were They Thinking and Why? alongside The Phantom.

References

Notes

External links
 
 

1990s adventure comedy films
1996 comedy films
1996 films
American adventure comedy films
British adventure comedy films
Canadian adventure comedy films
Films based on children's books
Films directed by John Landis
Films shot in Toronto
Golden Raspberry Award winning films
Savoy Pictures films
1990s English-language films
1990s American films
1990s Canadian films
1990s British films